is an interchange passenger railway station located in Naka-ku, Yokohama, Japan, operated by East Japan Railway Company (JR East) and the Yokohama Municipal Subway.

Lines

Station layout
JR Kannai Station is an elevated station with two opposed side platforms, connected to the station building below by underpasses. The Yokohama Municipal Subway Blue Line Station is located on the 2nd & 3rd underground floors, north of the main station. It has two island platforms serving three tracks. Platform 1 is not used due to the curvature of the line, and there is no corresponding track. Platforms 2 and 4 are in use, and Platform 3 is not in use for embarking or disembarking passengers but only for storage.

JR Platforms

Blue Line Platforms

History
Kannai Station was opened on  May 9, 1964 as a station on the Japanese National Railways (JNR). The Yokohama Municipal Subway began operations to Kannai Station from September 4, 1976. The station was absorbed into the JR East network upon the privatization of the JNR in 1987.

Passenger statistics
In fiscal 2019, an average of 55,299 passengers daily boarded the JR line from this station. During the same period, an additional 23,299 passengers (boarding passengers only) made use of this station for the Blue Line.

The daily average passenger figures (boarding passengers only) for previous years are as shown below.

Surrounding area
Yokohama City Hall
Yokohama Cultural Gymnasium
Yokohama Park
Yokohama Stadium
Yokohama Media Business Center
Kanagawa Shimbun
TV Kanagawa headquarters
Isezakichō Shopping Street
Yokohama Chinatown

See also
 List of railway stations in Japan

References

External links

 
 Yokohama Subway Kannai Station
 Sightseeing areas near Kannai Station

Railway stations in Kanagawa Prefecture
Railway stations in Japan opened in 1964
Naka-ku, Yokohama
Negishi Line
Keihin-Tōhoku Line
Blue Line (Yokohama)
Stations of Yokohama City Transportation Bureau
Railway stations in Yokohama